Francis N'Ganga (born June 16, 1985) is a Congolese footballer who plays as a left back in Belgium for Lokeren.

Club career
On 12 July 2019, he signed with Lokeren.

International career
His debut in the national team was on 7 September 2008 in Brazzaville vs.	Mali.

He represented the national team at the 2015 Africa Cup of Nations, where his team advanced to the quarterfinals.

Career statistics

Club

International

Scores and results list Congo's goal tally first.

References

External links
 
 
 
 

1985 births
Living people
Association football fullbacks
Association football midfielders
Republic of the Congo footballers
Republic of the Congo international footballers
French footballers
French sportspeople of Republic of the Congo descent
French expatriate footballers
French expatriate sportspeople in Belgium
Expatriate footballers in Belgium
Expatriate footballers in Cyprus
Sportspeople from Poitiers
Grenoble Foot 38 players
Tours FC players
R. Charleroi S.C. players
Ermis Aradippou FC players
K.S.C. Lokeren Oost-Vlaanderen players
Belgian Pro League players
Ligue 1 players
Ligue 2 players
Cypriot First Division players
2015 Africa Cup of Nations players
Footballers from Nouvelle-Aquitaine
French expatriate sportspeople in Cyprus
Republic of the Congo expatriate sportspeople in Belgium
Republic of the Congo expatriate footballers
Republic of the Congo expatriate sportspeople in Cyprus